Salute is a 2016 Pakistani biographical film directed, written & produced by Shahzad Rafique. The film is based on the life of martyr Aitzaz Hasan who confronted a suicide bomber, preventing his attempt to detonate a bomb in his school, saving roughly 2000 lives. The film stars Ali Mohtesham, Ajab Gul and Saima Noor in leading roles.

The film was distributed by IMGC Global Entertainment and released nationwide on 2 December 2016. The film received positive reviews from critics but was a box-office failure.

Plot
The film details the life of Shaheed Aitzaz Hasan Bangash, a school boy from Hangu, Pakistan; who, on 6 January 2014 confronted a suicide bomber outside his school. He prevented the terrorist from causing more casualties in the explosion and saved 2,000 lives.

Cast
 Ali Mohtesham as Shaheed Aitzaz Hasan
 Ajab Gul as Mujahid Ali Bangash(Hasan's father)
 Saima Noor as Aitzaz Hasan's mother
 Adnan Khan
 Nayyar Ejaz
 Rashid Mehmood
 Pervaiz Kaleem
 Jalal Haider
 Sardar Shaukat
 Ahsan
 Manzar Baig
 Mahnoor
 Mirza Ali Baig
 Umer Shahzad
 Nazar Gilani
 Ahmad
 Mirza Moneb
 Atta Muhammad Khan
 Sheraz

Production
On the first anniversary of Aitzaz Hassan's death at the Lahore's Alhamra Arts Complex, Shahzad announced that he would make a film titled 'Salute' which would be a biopic of Aitzaz life. Saima Noor and Ajab Gul were cast in lead roles and would play the role of Atizaz's parents. Shahzad confirmed that the film's Post-production would be done in state of the art studios in the United States and Bangkok. The TV rights for the film are owned by Urdu 1.

Filming
Due to security issues and the nature of the film, the Director Shahzad was unable to shoot the film in the Tribal Areas of Pakistan. Instead, the major parts of the film were shot in Azad Kashmir in Mirpur and Kotli.

Release
The film was originally slated for a May 2015 release but was postponed to 23 March 2016. For unexplained reasons, the film was pushed back once more to 5 August 2016, but was later pushed further back. A teaser for the film was released online on 11 Aug 2016. A theatrical trailer of film was released on 7 September 2016. IMGC Distribution Club distributed the Film in Pakistan nationwide on 2 December 2016. PTV premiered film on 6 January 2019.

See also
 List of Pakistani films of 2016
 List of biographical films

External links

References

2016 films
Pakistani biographical films
Pakistani multilingual films
2010s biographical films
Pashto-language films
2010s Urdu-language films
Films shot in Azad Kashmir